Super Balita sa Tanghali Nationwide is the noontime newscast of AM station DZBB anchored by Lala Roque and Orly Trinidad. The radio program is streaming online on Super Radyo DZBB's Facebook page and is also simulcast on all GMA Super Radyo stations in the country. On March 23, 2020, until September 18, 2020, the newscast had its simulcast under Dobol B sa News TV block on GMA News TV as a provisional programming measure due to the COVID-19 pandemic.

Anchors
 Orly Trinidad (2017–present)
 Lala Roque (2019–present)
 Weng dela Peña (substitute for Trinidad; 2019–present)
 Kaye Morales (substitute for Roque; 2020-present) (also on Super Balita sa Tanghali Saturday edition)
 Ralph Obina (substitute for Trinidad; 2021-present)
 Shirley Escalante (substitute for Roque; 2021-present)
 Sam Nielsen (substitute for Trinidad; 2022-present) (also on Super Balita sa Tanghali Saturday edition)
 Glen Juego (substitute for Trinidad; 2022-present)

Former anchors
 Melo del Prado (2008–2018)
 Gani Oro (2008–2013)
 Benjie Alejandro (2013–2017; 2018–2019)
 Julee Ann Mae Cabrera-Cera (2019–2021)

Awards
 Winner, Special Citation Award for News Program - 39th Catholic Mass Media Awards (2017)

See also
GMA News and Public Affairs
Super Radyo DZBB
Super Balita sa Umaga Nationwide

References

Philippine radio programs
2008 radio programme debuts
GMA Integrated News and Public Affairs shows